Darra is a village and village council located in Tehsil and District Swabi, in the Khyber Pakhtunkhwa province of Pakistan. Its population in 2017 was 8,692.

Climate 
The village is located in a district Swabi with a climate characterized by extreme temperatures. Summers are scorching hot, with a sharp rise in temperature from May to June and high temperatures in July, August, and September. Dust storms are frequent during May and June, particularly at night. Due to cultivation and irrigation, the area can also be humid and oppressive. As the year progresses, temperatures start to drop rapidly from October onwards, with January being the coldest month. Thunderstorms and hailstorms can occur towards the end of the cold weather.

The heaviest rainfall in the village occurs in July and August, resulting in hot and humid weather. The relative humidity remains high throughout the year, with December having the highest recorded levels.

The village is situated in the path of the 'Badri Khoar' canal which flows from the north(swabi,kala) towards the south and passes through Darra and Panjpir.

During heavy rainfall, the water level in the canal can rise significantly, although it usually does not reach the level of the houses as they are situated on slightly elevated ground. However, in the past, some wooden bridges constructed over the canal were washed away, and one concrete bridge was also destroyed due to flooding. Although the flooding did not cause significant damage to houses, it remains a concern for the villagers.

Overall, the climate in Darra can be challenging for the villagers, with extreme temperatures and occasional flooding.

References

External links 

Populated places in Swabi District
Populated places in Swabi District
Union councils of Khyber Pakhtunkhwa
Union Councils of Swabi District